"1955" is a song by Australian hip hop group Hilltop Hoods. It was released as the second single from the group's second remix album, Drinking from the Sun, Walking Under Stars Restrung (2016). In Australia, "1955" peaked at No. 2 on the Australian ARIA Singles Chart, becoming Hilltop Hoods' highest charting single to date. The song was rated number four in Triple J's Hottest 100 in 2016. The song's accompanying music video was released on 7 February 2016 via their Facebook page.

To celebrate the release of the album, "1955" along with the other tracks on Drinking from the Sun, Walking Under Stars Restrung were performed in the Restrung Tour. This tour went to Australia's five capital cities and featured Australia's best symphony orchestras and choirs along with special guest Maverick Sabre and Montaigne.

Background 
Inspiration for the song came when Matthew Lambert (Suffa) and his wife went to see comedian Dylan Moran. Moran opened the show by stating that he'd always wanted to come to Adelaide to see what it would've been like in 1955. Lambert later commented on Moran's performance:

Hilltop Hoods collaborated with Australian singer Montaigne and beatboxer Tom Thum for the song.

In an interview with Triple J, Suffa commented on what the song was about:

Composition 
"1955" is a hip hop song which is written in the key E major and has a tempo of 84 beats per minute. The track goes for 3 minutes and 59 seconds.

Reference to popular culture 
Tom Thum's opening line in the track makes reference to "sniffing salts", a chemical compound that was used in the early 20th century that could be used to wake someone up from an unconscious state. The lyrics are relayed to imitate an old radio advertisement: 

The group also criticise the amount of racial profiling that occurs in society, by making reference to the "Clutch of Fear": the act of clutching a purse in fear due to the racial profiling of a nearby individual.

Suffa is quick to dismiss the advice of people who watch news channels like Fox, stating how they are unreliable and biased:

The group makes reference to 'Plan C'. A plan devised by the FBI during the Cold War which enforced martial law if a nuclear attack was to occur. Hence "it gets so quiet at night", since the military was able to enforce new laws such as curfews during this period.

There is also a reference to "the War of the Worlds" episode in the anthology series "The Mercury Theater on the Air". This radio broadcast features an alien invasion story, which causes mass panic amongst civilians as they are not aware that the broadcast is a work of fiction. This reference is made in Tom Thum's lyrics:

Music video 
The music video was initially released on 7 February 2016 and was produced by Anna Bardsley-Jones and directed by Richard Coburn. It features a cameo from rapper Briggs as "Grill Murray" and is set in a 1950s diner. The video depicts a wholesome environment where everything seems perfect and peaceful and all the people are happy and polite. However, the viewers of the video observe the diner through the eyes of a young girl (Montaigne) and how, beneath the surface, everything is not what it seems to be. This is shown through the various emotional outbursts that occur throughout the video by the patrons of the diner. The music video was nominated for Best Video at the ARIA Music Awards of 2016.

Chart performance 
In Australia, "1955" debuted at number 25 on the Australia ARIA Singles Chart in the week beginning 21 February 2016. It peaked at number 2 four weeks later in the week beginning 13 March 2016. The track managed to stay on the charts for a total of 28 weeks.

Charts

Certifications

References

2016 singles
2016 songs
Hilltop Hoods songs
Montaigne (musician) songs
Universal Music Australia singles